Maximilien Robespierre (1758–1794) was a leader of the French Revolution and French Revolutionary Wars.

Robespierre may also refer to:
 Robespierre (Paris Métro), a station in the suburb of Montreuil
 Robespierre Monument, a monument to Robespierre in Moscow

People with the surname
 Augustin Robespierre (1763–1794), French lawyer, politician and brother of Maximilien
 Charlotte de Robespierre (1760–1834), French memoirist and sister of Maximilien
 Gillian Robespierre (born 1978), American film director and writer

See also
 Team Robespierre, an American band